Super Mario 64 DS is a 2004 platform game developed and published by Nintendo for the Nintendo DS. It was a launch game for the DS. Super Mario 64 DS is a remake of the 1996 Nintendo 64 game Super Mario 64, with new graphics, characters, collectibles, a multiplayer mode, and several extra minigames. As with the original, the plot centers on rescuing Princess Peach from Bowser. Unlike the original, Yoshi is the first playable character, with Mario, Luigi, and Wario being unlockable characters in early phases of the game.

Nintendo revealed Super Mario 64 DS as a multiplayer demonstration at E3 2004, and released it in November 2004. The game received generally positive reviews from critics, who praised its single-player mode, graphics and the changes made from the original game. However, it was criticized for its multiplayer mode and lack of analog controls. The game is the tenth best-selling Nintendo DS game, with over 11.06 million copies sold by 2018. Super Mario 64 DS was re-released on the Wii U's Virtual Console service across 2015 and 2016.

Plot 
The game begins with Mario receiving a letter from Princess Peach inviting him to come to her castle for a cake she has baked for him. Mario arrives at Peach's castle, along with Luigi and Wario. The trio disappear as they enter the castle, and Lakitu, the game's camera operator, informs Yoshi of their disappearance. Yoshi explores Peach's castle to find Mario, Luigi, Wario, and Peach.

Scattered throughout the castle are paintings and secret walls, which act as portals to other worlds where Bowser and his minions guard the Power Stars. After recovering some of the power stars and defeating Bowser's minions, Yoshi unlocks doors that access other areas of the castle, where he finds Mario and his friends imprisoned in various rooms.

Yoshi defeats Goomboss and frees Mario as they continue searching the castle to find more Power Stars. Mario defeats King Boo and frees Luigi with the key he got from the boss, who then defeats Chief Chilly, and then frees Wario using the key he got. Mario and his friends tackle two obstacle courses, with each ensuing a battle with Bowser. After defeating him each time, they receive a key that opens more levels of the castle. Mario and his friends eventually reach the highest area of the castle and come across the endless stairs, which constantly loops when trying to climb it.

After collecting 80 Power Stars, the endless stairs' magic stops and Mario confronts Bowser alone (as he is the only one allowed to gain access to the top). After Bowser's defeat, Mario and his friends return to Peach's castle, where they free Peach from a stained-glass window above the entrance. As a reward for saving Peach, she kisses Mario on the nose and goes to bake the cake she had promised. The game ends when Mario, Luigi, Peach, Yoshi, and Wario wave goodbye to the player as Lakitu films and flies away. A photo with Peach's cake appears.

Gameplay 

Super Mario 64 DS is a 3D platformer in which the player switches between four different characters – Yoshi, Mario, Luigi, and Wario – and controls them through numerous levels to collect 150 Power Stars, 30 more than the original game. Each character is essential to fully complete the game. Each level is an enclosed world (usually contained within and entered through a painting) in which the player is free to wander in all directions and discover the environment without time limits. The worlds are inhabited with enemies that attack the characters, as well as friendly creatures that provide assistance, offer information, or ask for help. The player gathers stars in each course; some stars only appear after completing certain tasks, often hinted at by the name of the star in the star select menu. These challenges include defeating bosses, solving puzzles, racing an opponent, and gathering coins. As the player collects stars, more areas of the castle become accessible.

Power-ups in Super Mario 64 DS take the form of special hats resembling those worn by Mario, Luigi, and Wario (all voiced by Charles Martinet), and are available in some levels. Acquiring one such hat will change the player's character into the corresponding character, allowing the player to use that character's abilities. The hats fall off if the character is hit, but can be reacquired. Yoshi (voiced by Kazumi Totaka) is able to start a level wearing the hat of any of the other available characters. Another power-up item, the "Power Flower", provides each character with a different ability: Mario is able to float, similar to Super Mario Worlds balloon item; Luigi becomes intangible and transparent, similar to the Vanish Cap in the Nintendo 64 version; Wario becomes coated by metal, which makes him temporarily invincible to enemy attacks and poison (which is purple instead of yellow as in the original version), and sink underwater, similar to the Metal Cap in the original version, but with the added ability to walk on lava instead of bouncing without taking damage; and Yoshi is able to breathe fire, which allows him to burn enemies and melt ice. Each ability is necessary to complete specific areas in the game. Other items include the "Mushroom", which is a semi-rare item that greatly increases the character's size and strength for a short period of time, and the Feather, that only Mario can get, and which allows him to fly in the same fashion as the Wing Cap in the original game. However, in multiplayer VS. Mode, other characters can get wings; in Yoshi's case, he grows wings out of his body, like in Super Mario World.

The game uses both of the system's screens to offer new options. The top screen displays the normal gameplay, while the bottom touchscreen can function as an overhead map and touch controls. The overhead map displays the current course the player traverses and displays item locations. The touch controls include virtual buttons, which rotate the top screen's camera angle, and directional character controls, which can operate with either the DS stylus or the player's thumb using the DS wrist strap. In addition to the single-player adventure, the game includes 36 minigames and a multiplayer mode. Minigames are made accessible by catching rabbits in the main game. All the minigames use the touchscreen to play and are based on different themes: racing, card games, puzzles, and so forth. The multiplayer mode uses the wireless DS Download Play where up to four players compete against each other using Green, Red, Blue, and Yellow Yoshi (voiced by Kazumi Totaka)—character hats appear in the stage allowing players to transform into either Mario, Luigi, or Wario. Wario can stun opponents by picking them up, swinging them around, and throwing them.

Development 

Super Mario 64 DS was developed by Nintendo Entertainment Analysis and Development and published by Nintendo for the Nintendo DS. It is a remake of the Nintendo 64 launch game Super Mario 64, with the game's 3D engine mirroring many visual effects used in the original game. Graphical changes include the lack of texture filtering, and updated versions of the character models which represented their updated, more detailed designs. Coins have been upgraded from 2D animation to 3D models.  All of Koji Kondo's music from the original game was re-used, with Kenta Nagata providing new music for the game. The voice actors from Super Mario 64 returned as well, and Kazumi Totaka joined the cast, playing the role of Yoshi.

Release and promotion 
Originally titled "Super Mario 64 ×4", the game was first shown as a multiplayer demonstration at the 2004 E3 before the Nintendo DS was released. A few months later, Nintendo announced an actual game—along with many others—was in development. At the Nintendo DS conference on October 7, 2004, the game was on demonstration again and new information was revealed; the name was changed to Super Mario 64 DS and four different characters (Mario, Luigi, Yoshi, and Wario) would be used in the main, single-player adventure. The demonstration was a more complete version of the game than the E3 version—the game's development was 90% complete at this time—and highlighted the multiple characters in the single-player mode and included minigames; the multiplayer mode, however, was not present.

Prior to the conference, the appearance of the box art on GameStop's product page caused speculation Super Mario 64 DS would be a launch game. Nintendo confirmed the rumor by announcing at the conference that the game would be a launch game of the Nintendo DS in North America and Japan. As the game's release approached, the release schedule of launch games altered; many games were delayed, while others were announced to be released a few days before the Nintendo DS. Super Mario 64 DS was the only game scheduled to be released with the system.

Super Mario 64 DS was first released in North America for the Nintendo DS on November 21, 2004 as a launch game for the system. On June 5, 2011, the game was repackaged in a red-colored case (along with New Super Mario Bros., Mario Kart DS, Mario Party DS, Mario & Luigi: Bowser's Inside Story, and Mario vs. Donkey Kong: Mini-Land Mayhem!) in tandem with a price drop of $99 for the DS. Super Mario 64 DS was later rereleased in Japan for the Wii U as a part of the Virtual Console line of games on January 6, 2016, and was later released in North America in August of that year.

Reception

Sales 
Super Mario 64 DS has been commercially successful. Following its release in Japan, the game sold 241,000 copies by December 19, 2004, and was the fifth best-selling game on the weekly sales chart of that week. Sales continued to increase, and Super Mario 64 DS had sold 639,000 units by February 20, 2005. The game frequently appeared on Amazon.com's sales charts. In the first week of June 2006, it was listed as the sixth best-selling Nintendo DS game, and had risen to number three by the last week of the month. The game appeared again near the end of July 2006 as the eighth-bestselling game. At the beginning of 2008, Amazon.com charts listed the game as the seventh best-selling Nintendo DS game in the United States. In the United States, it sold 1.4 million copies and earned $42 million by August 2006. During the period between January 2000 and August 2006, it was the 7th highest-selling game launched for the Nintendo DS. By November 2006, the game had sold over one million units in Europe, and by the end of 2007, over two million copies in the United States. By May 31, 2011, the game had sold 4.34 million copies in the United States, and in October 2012 Nintendo reported that the game had surpassed sales of 5 million units. As of March 31, 2018, Super Mario 64 DS has sold 11.06 million copies worldwide.

Critics 

The game has won awards and met with overall positive reviews from video game journalists. Upon its release, IGN labeled it as an "Editor's Choice" and awarded it "Game of the Month" for the Nintendo DS, citing the game as a "great achievement" of the system's capability. In 2005, the game won a Golden Joystick Award for best handheld game of year. Prior to the game's release, Craig Harris of IGN reviewed the early demonstration. He commented on the accurate recreation of the original graphics, and stated that the small Nintendo DS screen helps hide any visual flaws. Harris criticized the game's controls calling them a little "sluggish" and "clumsy". Though he praised the graphics and new gameplay additions, Harris expressed disappointment that the Mario launch game for the new system was a remake instead of a full game. IGN's Anoop Gantayat anticipated the game would be a big hit among American video game enthusiasts. In Japan, Famitsu ranked Super Mario 64 DS the 29th most wanted game.

Reviewers praised the game's accurate recreation of the Nintendo 64 game, additional features, and upgrades. Phil Theobald of GameSpy lauded Super Mario 64 DS, calling it "fantastic" and complimenting the new features: minigames, use of a second screen, and extra stars. He also commented that the gameplay of the original game holds up ten years after its original release. Harris said the original feel of Super Mario 64 is retained, while the new challenges and features build upon it in a way that added to the game's longevity. He complimented the graphics and audio, and considered the game a good demonstration of the Nintendo DS's capabilities. Jeff Gerstmann of GameSpot also complimented the graphics, specifically the higher polygon count and smooth frame rate. He called Super Mario 64 DS a "great update of a classic game", and felt the changes and additional features offered a new experience to fans of the original. In contrast, 1UP.com's Jeremy Parish felt the game did not offer enough new content to warrant a purchase. He praised the inclusion of extra characters, calling them a "nice twist", but concluded his review by calling the game a "poorly-conceived port" that should be played on the original system.

Other criticism focused on the game's controls and multiplayer mode. Theobald felt the lack of an analog stick made the controls more difficult than the original game and required a short period of adjustment. He further stated that the digital pad and touchscreen's virtual analog control were "tricky" and required practice. Harris echoed similar comments and noted the touchscreen does not provide physical feedback like an analog stick. He added the game was never intended to be played without proper analog controls. Gerstmann referred to the multiplayer mode as "uneventful" and considered it lacking longevity, but commented that it was a good extra that demonstrated the system's wireless multiplayer capabilities. Theobald agreed it was a nice addition, but considered it a "diversion" that players would tire of quickly.

Notes

References

External links 
Super Mario 64 DS at Nintendo.com
Super Mario 64 DS at iQue.com

2004 video games
3D platform games
64 DS
Multiplayer and single-player video games
Nintendo DS games
Nintendo Entertainment Analysis and Development games
Video game remakes
Video games developed in Japan
Video games produced by Shigeru Miyamoto
Virtual Console games for Wii U
Virtual Console games
Open-world video games

ja:スーパーマリオ64#スーパーマリオ64DS